The Humber Premier League is a football competition for clubs in the East Riding of Yorkshire and north Lincolnshire areas of England.

History
The league was formed in 2000. Reckitts won the league five times in the first six seasons of its existence.  The league started with one division in 2000 but has since grown and now has two divisions, the Premier Division and Division One--the latter inaugurated for the 2005-06 season.  The Premier Division sits at the 11th tier of the English football league system, and feeds the Northern Counties East League.

Since the formation of the league in 2000, only three teams from the Humber Premier League  have achieved promotion – Hull United in 2015  (their stay in the NCEFL was just a single season), East Yorkshire Carnegie two years later and Beverley Town in 2022.

Barton Town joined the league when it was formed in 2000 but only stayed for one season before they joined the Central Midlands Football League the following season. Barton's Reserves team joined the league's first division for the 2017–18 season.

Cleethorpes Town had a three-season stint in the Humber Premier League, from 2006 to 2009–10. In their first season, they won promotion from the first division after finishing 3rd and after two further seasons, playing in the Premier Division, they decided to rejoin the Lincolnshire Football League for the 2010–11 season. They have since gone on to play in the Northern Counties East League and gained promotion to the Northern Premier League.

On 26 March 2020, the FA made the decision to abandon the 2019–20 season, due to the COVID-19 pandemic, for all leagues at Step 7 and below of the English football league system, meaning that any remaining fixtures of the season would not be played and all games and prior results that season would be expunged.

At the end of the 2021-22 season, it was confirmed that Beverley Town had been successful in their application to join the Northern Counties East League. Beverley finished in 2nd position in that season and as a result, were promoted to NCEL division one.

Current member clubs (2022–23)

Premier Division

Division One

Champions

 Due to the COVID-19 restrictions, teams played each other once.

League Cup (Whiteheads Fish and Chips Cup)

References

 
Football in the East Riding of Yorkshire
Football in Lincolnshire
Football leagues in England
Sports leagues established in 2000
2000 establishments in England
Football competitions in Yorkshire